This is the discography of the British a cappella vocal group the Flying Pickets.

The group had a Christmas number one hit in 1983 in the UK Singles Chart with their cover of Yazoo's track "Only You".

The Flying Pickets have had very limited commercial success since their breakthrough hit, but continue to release various compilation albums globally up to present day.

Albums

Studio albums

Compilation albums

Live albums

Other albums featuring The Flying Pickets
Freudiana (1990)
The last Alan Parsons Project album, which was released simply as a solo album by Eric Woolfson. It was soon after adapted into Woolfson's first musical of the same name.

The Flying Pickets sing all the vocals on two tracks, (6) "Funny You Should Say That" and (8) "Far Away From Home."

Singles

References

External links
 Official website of the Flying Pickets
 Andrea Figallo's website
 Michael Henry's website
 Paul Kissaun's website
 Hereward Kaye's website

Discography
Discographies of British artists